Sun Long (was a Chinese landscape painter active during the early Ming Dynasty (1368–1644). His specific dates of birth and death are not known, though he was active during the Xuande era.

Sun was born in Piling (毗陵 modern day Changzhou in the Jiangsu province).  His style names were 'Tingzhen' (廷振) and 'Congji' (從吉).  His pseudonym was 'Douchi' (都痴). Sun painted landscapes, but also was well known for his plum, locust, and grass paintings.

Notes

References
 Barnhart, R. M. et al. (1997). Three thousand years of Chinese painting. New Haven, Yale University Press. 
 Zhongguo gu dai shu hua jian ding zu (中国古代书画鑑定组). 2000. Zhongguo hui hua quan ji (中国绘画全集). Zhongguo mei shu fen lei quan ji. Beijing: Wen wu chu ban she. Volume 10.

Ming dynasty landscape painters
Year of death unknown
Painters from Changzhou
Year of birth unknown
Chinese women artists
Chinese women painters